Legislative Council of India may refer to:

Council of India, advisors to British India from 1833 to 1935
Imperial Legislative Council, a legislature for British India from 1861 to 1947
Council of State (India), the upper house of the Indian legislature from 1920 to 1946 
State legislative councils of India, the upper houses of several state legislatures in present-day India

See also
Legislative council, with a list of bodies including some in India